"Headlong" is a song by British rock band Queen, released as the third single from fourteenth studio album, Innuendo (1991). The song was written by Queen guitarist Brian May, who intended to record it for his then-upcoming solo album Back to the Light (1992), but when he heard Queen lead singer Freddie Mercury sing the track, he allowed it to become a Queen song. As with all the songs on Innuendo, the track was promptly credited to the entire band.

The song was the first single to be released in the United States under their contract with Hollywood Records on 14 January 1991, though it was not released in the United Kingdom for another four months (the first single in the United Kingdom was "Innuendo", which Hollywood eventually released in the US as a promotional single for radio stations). The song charted on the Album Rock Tracks chart in the United States, reaching number three. When Innuendo was remastered in 2011, a version of the song with May on the lead vocals instead of Mercury was released.

The cover of one of the CD singles is inspired by Grandville illustrations, as are all of the other singles from the album.

Critical reception
Pan-European magazine Music & Media wrote, "Third single from the highly successful album Innuendo, is the kind of hard rock that Van Halen would be jealous of. EHR programmers shouldn't be afraid: it's loud but it's also melodic."

Chart performance
"Headlong" was the third single release from the album Innuendo in the band's native UK. Released in May 1991, it entered the UK singles chart at number 28 in its first week and peaked at number 14 during the following week. In total the song spent 3 weeks within the UK top 40. It was the second highest-charting song, off of the album, after the song "Innuendo", which had reached the top of the charts.

Promotional video
The accompanying music video for "Headlong" was one of the final Queen videos shot with lead singer Freddie Mercury, some 12 months before his death from AIDS, though it was actually shot before the "I'm Going Slightly Mad" video (released as the second single in the UK). The video showed the band in the studio performing the song (in a stage-like setup), as well as shots of the band working in the studio. The version of the song in the video includes an extra short section after the second chorus not released in any audio format to date.

The performance footage (Mercury wearing a yellow sweater) was shot in December 1990 and the studio footage (of Mercury wearing two different blue shirts) in November 1990, both at Metropolis Studios in London (the exterior of which is shown at the beginning and the end of the video). The footage were part of the Innuendo EPK filmed at Metropolis Studios at the end of 1990. This is also the last colour video of Freddie Mercury, whose health was declining due to the HIV virus which would claim his life on 24 November the following year. The next videos, "I'm Going Slightly Mad" and "These Are the Days of Our Lives" were recorded during February and May 1991 respectively, both in black-and-white.

Like all other videos for the Innuendo album, the "Headlong" clip was directed by Austrian director team DoRo, consisting of Rudi Dolezal and Hannes Rossacher, who had been regularly working for Queen since the video for the 1986 single "Friends Will Be Friends".

B-sides
"All God's People" and "Mad the Swine" accompanied "Headlong" on the flip side. The former alone, on the UK 7-inch single release and both tracks on the UK 12-inch release. "All God's People" is taken from the album Innuendo, where as "Mad the Swine" is a very early, previously unreleased song from 1972.

Track listings
 7-inch single
A. "Headlong" – 4:38
B. "All God's People" – 4:21

 12-inch and CD single
 "Headlong" – 4:38
 "All God's People" – 4:21
 "Mad the Swine" – 3:19

Personnel

 Freddie Mercury – lead and backing vocals
 Brian May – electric guitar, piano, keyboard, drum programming, backing vocals
 Roger Taylor – drums, backing vocals
 John Deacon – bass guitar

Charts

References

External links
 

Queen (band) songs
1991 singles
Parlophone singles
Songs written by Brian May
1990 songs
Hollywood Records singles
British hard rock songs